The North State Journal is a statewide newspaper in North Carolina founded by in 2016 by former members of the administration of governor Pat McCrory. The newspaper is headquartered in Raleigh, North Carolina.  North State Journal is owned by North State Media, LLC and is published by Neal Robbins, formerly of the North Carolina Department of Environment and Natural Resources (DENR). Two staff writers, Drew Elliot and Sarah Lindh were also former employees of DENR. In 2016, it had 16 journalists and 10 business-side staff.

Editorially, "North State Journals opinion section, consisting only of bylined columns, will emphasize free markets and individual liberty" compared with "center-left" leaning opinion sections of North Carolina’s major papers. In 2017, the paper published two issues per week, on Sunday and Wednesday.

Founder Neal Robbins stated to the Charlotte Observer that North State Journal is not partisan, and that it aims for objectivity.

In 2019, the paper won first place in General Excellence in print and online, for community newspapers in Division A from the North Carolina Press Association.

References

Newspapers published in North Carolina
Mass media in Raleigh, North Carolina
Publications established in 2016